The Bermuda Stock Exchange (BSX), established in 1971, is located in Hamilton, Bermuda. The stock exchange's 2010 'Year End Review' report stated that its aggregate market capitalisation (excluding mutual funds) stood at US$319 billion.

The exchange specialises in listing and trading of capital market instruments such as stocks, bonds, mutual fund (including hedge fund structures) and depository receipt programs.

The BSX has been granted approved stock exchange status under Australia's Foreign Investment Fund taxation rules, and, effective 1 September 2005 was granted designated investment exchange status by the United Kingdom's Financial Services Authority. The unique four symbol alphanumeric Market Identifier Code (MIC) used to identify the BSX as defined under ISO 10383. of the International Organization for Standardization (ISO) is: XBDA.

History
In 2019, Miami International Holdings acquired a majority stake in BSX.

Securities
The securities listed on the BSX are:

See also 
 List of stock exchanges in the Americas
 List of stock exchanges in the United Kingdom, the British Crown Dependencies and United Kingdom Overseas Territories

References

External links

Financial services companies established in 1971
Economy of Bermuda
Stock exchanges in the Caribbean
1971 establishments in Bermuda
Financial services companies of Bermuda